Doo Town is a Tasmanian holiday village within the locality of Eaglehawk Neck, near Port Arthur, where the house names contain “doo”.

History
Located 79 km southeast of country's capital Hobart, Doo Town was established in the 1830s as an unnamed timber station which eventually developed into a shack community. In 1935 a Hobart architect, Eric Round, placed the name plate Doo I 99 on his weekend shack. A neighbor, Charles Gibson, responded with a plate reading Doo Me, then Bill Eldrige with Doo Us. Eric Round's shack was later renamed Xanadu or Xanadoo.

The trend caught on and most of the homes have a plate that includes the name 'Doo'. Some shacks play on the theme, with 'do' and even 'du' variations.

House names
Af-2-Doo, Da Doo Ron Ron, Didgeri-Doo, Doo-All, Doo Come In, Doodle Doo, Doo Drop In, Doo For Now, Doo Fuck All, Doo I, Doo-ing it easy, Doo Luv It, Doo-Me, Doo Nix, Doo Not Disturb, Doo Nothing, Doo Often, Doo Us, Doo Us Too, Doo Write, Dr DooLittle, Gunnadoo, Humpty Doo, Just Doo It, Love Me Doo, Make Doo, Much-A-Doo, Rum Doo, Sheil Doo, This Will Doo, Thistle Doo Me, Wattle-I-Doo, Wee-Doo, Xanadu, Yabba Dabba Doo.

Interestingly, the list does not yet contain the names Doo Hast or Scooby-Doo.

The one non-conforming house has a plate that reads Medhurst.

In popular culture
In 2004, Off Planet Films made a pilot for a television cartoon series set in and named after the Tasmanian town, the cartoon portrayed a "backwater" town full of dodgy characters, rednecks, aliens, strip-clubs and gratuitous nudity.

References 

Towns in Tasmania